WLBR (1270 AM, "News Talk & Sports 1270 WLBR") is a radio station broadcasting a conservative talk format. Licensed to Lebanon, Pennsylvania. the station is currently owned by Seven Mountains Media, and features programming from Westwood One (formerly Cumulus Media Networks) and Salem Radio Network. Prior to the sale of WLBR and WQIC (now WFVY), both stations were owned by the Lebanon Broadcasting Company.

WLBR's studio shares the same building with sister station, 100.1 WFVY, along Pennsylvania Route 72 in Ebenezer, 2 miles northwest of Lebanon. The building has been the home of the station since the 1950s. WLBR's transmitter and four towers stand behind the studios.

After over 70 years of family ownership, Lebanon Broadcasting president Robert Etter announced on August 23, 2019, that he was selling WLBR and WQIC to Holidaysburg-based Forever Media for $1.225 million. The transaction was finalized on December 31, 2019.

On April 28, 2020, the station flipped to classic hits as WiLBuR 1270.

The station was affiliated with ABC News Radio for many decades until April 2020 when the station switched to Westwood One News. However, the affiliation with WWO News was short-lived as the service ceased operations on August 30, 2020. The station now carries NBC News Radio.

In late November 2021, WLBR switched to a 24/7 Christmas music format, replacing WROZ in Lancaster as an official Christmas station in Central Pennsylvania and the entire Lebanon Valley. The station returned to its Classic Hits format on December 27 at midnight.

WLBR flipped from classic hits to conservative talk on March 15, 2022.

It was announced on October 12, 2022 that Forever Media is selling 34 stations, including WLBR and WFVY, to State College-based Seven Mountains Media for $17.3 million. The deal closed on January 2, 2023.

References

External links

LBR
Lebanon, Pennsylvania
Radio stations established in 1946
1946 establishments in Pennsylvania
Talk radio stations in the United States
Conservative talk radio